Ron Gourlay is the CEO of West Bromwich Albion. He was formerly CEO of Chelsea and Reading.

Football

Chelsea
Ron Gourlay worked at Chelsea since 2004, having previously worked for Manchester United and Umbro.
He was appointed the chief executive of Chelsea on 17 September 2009, following Peter Kenyon's decision to leave the club on 31 October 2009.

He was quoted as saying: "It is a huge honour to be offered the chance to lead Chelsea". "We have a fantastic team both on and off the field and those teams can move us on to even greater success in the future. To be responsible for that is a fantastic challenge and I will be giving it my total commitment, drive and energy" after being named as the successor.

Reading
On 10 July 2017, Gourlay was appointed as CEO of Reading, leaving his role with immediate effect on 19 November 2018. Following his departure, former-Reading chairman John Madejski claimed that Gourlay did not understand the culture at Reading and that he had damaged links between the community and club during his sixteen months at the club.

West Bromwich Albion
On 2 February 2022 following the departure of then head coach Valerien Ismael, Gourlay was appointed as CEO of West Bromwich Albion.

References

British chief executives
Chelsea F.C. non-playing staff
British sports executives and administrators
Living people
Year of birth missing (living people)
Chief operating officers